The Umpqua Post was a weekly newspaper serving Reedsport, Oregon, United States and the surrounding area in Douglas and Coos counties. It was published each Wednesday by The World newspaper in Coos Bay. The paper was distributed in Reedsport and nearby Gardiner, Scottsburg, Elkton, Winchester Bay and Coos Bay. Total circulation each week was 1,528 copies.

History 
The Post was first published on November 4, 1996, by founders Elizabeth Adamo and Nancie Hammond. The paper was purchased by Pulitzer, Inc. in 2004. Ownership shifted to Lee Enterprises in 2005 with that company's acquisition of Pulitzer. In January 2020, the paper was sold by Lee to Country Media, Inc.

Country Media ceased publication of the Post in June, 2020. At the time, Publisher Ben Kenfield cited the economic downturn caused by the COVID-19 pandemic as the reason for the closure.

References

External links
Official website

Coos County, Oregon
Douglas County, Oregon
Lee Enterprises publications
Newspapers published in Oregon
Oregon Newspaper Publishers Association
Weekly newspapers published in the United States
Newspapers established in 1996
1996 establishments in Oregon